This is a list of high school athletic conferences in the East and Southeast Regions of Ohio, as defined by the OHSAA. Because the names of localities and their corresponding high schools do not always match and because there is often a possibility of ambiguity with respect to either the name of a locality or the name of a high school, the following table gives both in every case, with the locality name first, in plain type, and the high school name second in boldface type. The school's team nickname is given last.

Buckeye 8 Athletic League
All schools are also affiliated with the Ohio Valley Athletic Conference.

North Division
 East Liverpool Beaver Local Beavers (2013–)
 East Liverpool Potters (2013–)
 Richmond Edison Wildcats (2005–2023)
 Cadiz Harrison Central Huskies (2005–)
 Wintersville Indian Creek Redskins (2005–)

South Division
 Bellaire Big Reds (2005–)
 Cambridge Bobcats (2021–)
 Martins Ferry Purple Riders (2005–2024)
 St. Clairsville Red Devils (2005–)
 Belmont Union Local Jets (2005–)

Former Members
 Rayland Buckeye Local Panthers (2005–2020)

Frontier Athletic Conference
This league formed in October 2016 in preparation for August 2017 from the remnants of the South Central Ohio League.
 Chillicothe Cavaliers (2017–)
 Hillsboro Indians (2017–)
 Jackson Ironmen (2017–)
 Greenfield McClain Tigers (2017–)
 Washington Court House Miami Trace Panthers (2017–)
 Washington Court House Blue Lions (2017–)

Independents
 Logan Chieftains
 Manchester Greyhounds (football only, Southern Hills member in other sports)
 Seaman North Adams Green Devils (football only, Southern Hills member in other sports)
 Peebles Indians (football only, Southern Hills member in other sports)
 West Union Dragons (football only, Southern Hills member in other sports)

Inter-Valley Conference

Large school division
 Uhrichsville Claymont Mustangs (2017-)
 Sugarcreek Garaway Pirates (1968–)
 Berlin Hiland Hawks (No football) (1968–)
 Gnadenhutten Indian Valley Braves (2017–)
 Newcomerstown Trojans (1968–)
 West Lafayette Ridgewood Generals (1968–)
 Zoarville Tuscarawas Valley Trojans (1974–77, 2017–)

Small school division
 Lore City Buckeye Trail Warriors (2017-)
 Bowerstown Conotton Valley Rockets (2001–11, 2017–) (All sports except football)
 East Canton Hornets (2013-)
 Malvern Hornets (1968–)
 Magnolia Sandy Valley Cardinals (2001–)
 Strasburg Strasburg-Franklin Tigers (1971–)
 New Philadelphia Tuscarawas Central Catholic Saints (1970–)

Former members
 Midvale Indian Valley North Big Blue (1968–88, consolidated into Indian Valley)
 Gnadenhutten Indian Valley South Rebels (1968–88, consolidated into Indian Valley)
 Dover St. Joseph Ramblers (1968–70, consolidated into Tuscarawas Central Catholic)
 Dennison St. Mary's Blue Wave (1968–70, consolidated into Tuscarawas Central Catholic)
 Freeport Lakeland Raiders (1974–99, consolidated into Harrison Central)
 Jewett-Scio Vikings (1974–99, consolidated into Harrison Central)

Mid-Ohio Valley League
Scarlet Division
 Barnesville Shamrocks (2021-)
 Woodsfield Monroe Central Seminoles (2019–)
 Hannibal River Pilots (2019–)
 Shadyside Tigers (2019–)
 Sarahsville Shenandoah Zeppelins (2021–)
 Rayland Buckeye Local Panthers (2021–)

Gray Division
 Beallsville Blue Devils (2021–)
 Bridgeport Bulldogs (2019–)
 New Matamoras Frontier Cougars (2019–)
 Paden City (WV) Wildcats (2021–)

Former members
 New Martinsville (WV) Magnolia Blue Eagles (2019–2021)

Future members
 Caldwell Redskins

Muskingum Valley League
Big school Division
 New Concord John Glenn Muskies (1962–)
 Zanesville Maysville Panthers (1963–)
 Duncan Falls Philo Electrics (1938–)
 Warsaw River View Black Bears (1973-2003, 2020–)
 Thornville Sheridan Generals (1966–)
 Dresden Tri-Valley Scotties (1966–)

Small school Division
 Coshocton Redskins (2020–)
 Crooksville Ceramics (1930–, known as Big Red until 1935)
 Byesville Meadowbrook Colts (2020–)
 McConnelsville Morgan Raiders (1966–)
 New Lexington Panthers (1930–)
 Zanesville West Muskingum Tornadoes (1966–)

Former Member
 Glouster Tomcats (1930–65)
 McConnelsville Malta-McConnelsville Big Reds (1930–66, consolidated into Morgan)
 New Concord Little Muskies (1930–62, consolidated into John Glenn)
 Caldwell Redskins (1933–64)
 Roseville Ramblers (1944–70, consolidated into Philo)
 Zanesville St. Thomas Irish (1944–46)
 Dresden Jefferson J-Hawks (1950–66, consolidated into Tri-Valley)

Ohio Valley Athletic Conference

Division A
 Beallsville Blue Devils
 Bellaire St. John Central Academy Fighting Irish
 Bowerston Conotton Valley Rockets
 Cameron (WV) Dragons
 Hundred (WV) Hornets
 Weirton (WV) Madonna Blue Dons
 Paden City (WV) Wildcats
 Morgantown (WV) Trinity Christian Warriors
 Pine Grove (WV) Valley Lumberjacks
 Wellsville Tigers

Division AA
 Bridgeport Bulldogs
 Caldwell Redskins
 Blacksville (WV) Clay-Battelle Cee-Bees
 New Matamoras Frontier Cougars
 Woodsfield Monroe Central Seminoles
 Shadyside Tigers
 Salineville Southern Local Indians
 Steubenville Catholic Central Crusaders
 Toronto Red Knights
 Wheeling Central Catholic (WV) Maroon Knights

Division AAA
 Barnesville Shamrocks
 Bellaire Big Reds
 Rayland Buckeye Local Panthers
 Lore City Buckeye Trail Warriors
 Beverly Fort Frye Cadets
 Wheeling (WV) Linsly Cadets
 New Martinsville (WV) Magnolia Blue Eagles
 Martins Ferry Purple Riders
 Hannibal River Pilots
 Sarahsville Shenandoah Zeps

Division AAAA
 East Liverpool Beaver Local Beavers
 Cambridge Bobcats
 East Liverpool Potters
 Richmond Edison Wildcats
 Cadiz Harrison Central Huskies
 Wintersville Indian Creek Redskins
 New Cumberland (WV) Oak Glen Golden Bears
 St. Clairsville Red Devils
 Belmont Union Local Jets
 Weirton (WV) Weir Red Raiders

Division AAAAA
 Wellsburg (WV) Brooke Bruins
 Dover Tornados
 Glen Dale (WV) John Marshall Monarchs
 Marietta Tigers
 Morgantown (WV) Mohigans
 New Philadelphia Quakers
 Parkersburg South (WV) Patriots
 Steubenville Big Red
 Morgantown (WV) University Hawks
 Vincent Warren Warriors
 Wheeling (WV) Wheeling Park Patriots

Conference affiliations
 Buckeye 8 Conference -  Beaver Local, Bellaire, Cambridge, East Liverpool, Edison, Harrison Central, Indian Creek, Martins Ferry, St. Clairsville, Union Local
 Eastern Ohio Athletic Conference - Southern, Toronto, Wellsville
 Inter-Valley Conference - Buckeye Trail
 Mid-Ohio Valley League - Barnesville, Beallsville, Bridgeport, Buckeye Local, Frontier, Monroe Central, River, Shadyside, Shenandoah
 Twin State League - Fort Frye, Marietta, Warren

Ohio Valley Conference
 Chesapeake Panthers (1954–)
 Coal Grove Dawson-Bryant Hornets (1954–)
 Proctorville Fairland Dragons (1957–)
 Gallipolis Gallia Academy Blue Devils (2015–)
 Ironton Fighting Tigers (2014–)
 Portsmouth Trojans (2014–)
 Ironton Rock Hill Redmen (1954–)
 South Point Pointers (1954–)

Former members:
 Oak Hill Oaks (1954–84)
 Ironton St. Joseph Central Flyers (1962–79)
 Willow Wood Symmes Valley Vikings (1962–71, 1977–84)
 Ceredo-Kenova (WV) Wonders (1986–91; consolidated into Spring Valley HS in 1998)
 Buffalo (Wayne) (WV) Bison (1987–92; consolidated into Spring Valley HS in 1998)
 Wayne (WV) Pioneers (1987–88)
 Bidwell River Valley Raiders (2001–14)

Scioto Valley Conference
 Frankfort Adena Warriors1 (1968–)
 Chillicothe Huntington Huntsmen1 (1972–)
 Bainbridge Paint Valley Bearcats1 (1962–)
 Piketon Redstreaks (1962–)
 Chillicothe Southeastern Panthers (1975–)
 Chillicothe Unioto Shermans1 (1962–74, 1975–)
 Williamsport Westfall Mustangs (1964–)
 Chillicothe Zane Trace Pioneers1 (1971–)

Former members:
 Laurelville Wildcats (1962–72, consolidated into Logan Elm)
 Circleville Logan Elm Braves (1962–73, to Mid-State League)
 Lees Creek East Clinton Astros (1972–74)
 Chillicothe Bishop Flaget (Catholic) Panthers (1975–86, school closed)

 Ross County schools that were concurrent in SVC and Ross County League from date of SVC entrance until 1975.

Southern Hills Athletic Conference
Formed in 1970 as the Adams County League, Brown County League, and Highland County League merged to provide a stable schedule after consolidation decimated all three. The league has an odd distinction in that all of its current members were league members by its second year, giving the SHAC a level of continuity that most rural-based leagues do not have. Had Manchester and Peebles been able to adjust their schedules to include all members (both schools had been part of the Tri-County League as well. Manchester left upon entering the SHAC, Peebles played in both until 1984.), every current member would be a founding member.

Division I
 Winchester Eastern Warriors (1970–)
 Lynchburg-Clay Mustangs (no football, 1970–)
 Seaman North Adams Green Devils  (1970–)
Ripley-Union-Lewis-Huntington Blue Jays (no football, 1970–)
 West Union Dragons (1970–)

Division II
 Leesburg Fairfield Lions (no football, 1970–)
 Fayetteville-Perry Rockets (1970–, Southern Buckeye Athletic Conference in football 2016–)
 Manchester Greyhounds (1971–)
Peebles Indians (1971–)
 Mowrystown Whiteoak Wildcats (no football, 1970–)

Former schools
 Georgetown G-Men/Lady G-men (no football, 1970–97, to Southern Buckeye Athletic/Academic Conference)
 Jefferson Eagles (1970–71, consolidated into West Union)
 Mount Orab Western Brown Broncos (1970–72, to Clermont County League)
 St. Martin School of Brown County Ursulines Brown Bears (all girls, 1972–81, school closed)
 Latham Western Indians (1985–2002, to Southern Ohio Conference)

Southern Ohio Conference

Division I (Smaller schools)
 Portsmouth Clay Panthers (1979–) (no football)
 New Boston Glenwood Tigers (1946–) (no football)
 Franklin Furnace Green Bobcats (1979–)
 Portsmouth Notre Dame Titans (Portsmouth Central Catholic until 1984, 1954–)
 Ironton St. Joseph Central Flyers (1982–89, 2019–) (no football)
 Portsmouth Sciotoville Community Tartans (Portsmouth East until 2001, 1946–)
 Willow Wood Symmes Valley Vikings (1991–)
 Latham Western Indians (2002–) (no football)

Division II (Larger schools)
 Beaver Eastern Eagles (1981–) *plays in Div. I for football
 Minford Falcons (1947–58, 1959–)
 McDermott Northwest Mohawks (1960–) *plays in Div. I for football
 Oak Hill Oaks (1991–) 
 West Portsmouth Portsmouth West Senators (Washington Twp. until 1950, 1946–)
 South Webster Jeeps (1979–) *plays in Div. I for golf and boys soccer (no football)
 Lucasville Valley Indians (1958–) *plays in Div. I for boys soccer
 Waverly Tigers (1946–70, 1983–)
 Wheelersburg Pirates (1950–)

Former members
 Portsmouth Holy Redeemer Wildcats (1946–54, consolidated into Central Catholic)
 Portsmouth St. Mary's Titans (1946–54, consolidated into Central Catholic)
 Chesapeake Panthers (1948–54, to Ohio Valley Conference)
 South Point Pointers (1948–51, to Lawrence County League)
 Coal Grove Dawson-Bryant Hornets (1950–52, to Lawrence County League)
 Piketon Redstreaks (1958–62, to Scioto Valley League)

Tri-Valley Conference

Ohio Division
 Albany Alexander Spartans (1974–)
 The Plains Athens Bulldogs (2008–)
 Pomeroy Meigs Marauders (1983–)
 Nelsonville-York Buckeyes (1970–)
 Bidwell River Valley Raiders (2014–)
 McArthur Vinton County Vikings (1969–)
 Wellston Golden Rockets (1982–)

Hocking Division
 Belpre Golden Eagles (1969–)
 Reedsville Eastern Eagles (1993–)
 Stewart Federal Hocking Lancers (1969–)
 Crown City South Gallia Rebels (2010–2024)
 Racine Southern Tornadoes (1993–)
 Glouster Trimble Tomcats (1978–)
 Waterford Wildcats (1997–)

Former members:
 Corning Miller Falcons (1983–2020)
 Mason (WV) Wahama White Falcons (2010–2020)
 Vincent Warren Warriors (1969–1986)

Twin State League
 Beverly Fort Frye Cadets (2022–)
 Marietta Tigers (2022–)
 Point Pleasant (WV) Big Blacks (2022–)
 Vincent Warren Warriors (2022–)

Defunct conferences

See also
Ohio High School Athletic Association

Notes and references